The Greek Independence Day Parade takes place annually in the United States along Fifth Avenue in the Manhattan borough of New York City. The parade is held in annual April in honor of the Anniversary of Greek Declaration of Independence from the Ottoman Empire on March 25, 1821, and the Greek War of Independence. The parade attracts many Greek Americans from the Tri-State area and is the celebration of Greek heritage, Greek culture and Greek achievements in the world.

History
In 1938, the first Greek Independence Day Parade was held and has since become a in New York City annual event. The parade runs along 5th Avenue from 64th to 79th Streets and is sponsored by the Federation of Hellenic Societies of Greater New York.

See also

Greeks in New York City
Celebration of the Greek Revolution

References

Annual events in New York City
Cultural festivals in the United States
Festivals in Manhattan
Fifth Avenue
1938 establishments in New York City
Tourist attractions in Manhattan
Greek-American culture in New York City